Sixth-seeded Nicola Pietrangeli defeated Luis Ayala 3–6, 6–3, 6–4, 4–6, 6–3 in the final to win the men's singles tennis title at the 1960 French Championships.

Seeds
The seeded players are listed below. Nicola Pietrangeli is the champion; others show the round in which they were eliminated.

  Barry MacKay (quarterfinals)
  Neale Fraser (quarterfinals)
  Andrés Gimeno (quarterfinals)
  Rod Laver (third round)
  Luis Ayala (final)
  Nicola Pietrangeli (champion)
  Mike Davies (second round)
  Roy Emerson (third round)
  Pierre Darmon (fourth round)
  Robert Haillet (semifinals)
  Ian Vermaak (second round)
  Giuseppe Merlo (fourth round)
  Jacques Brichant (fourth round)
  Jan-Erik Lundqvist (second round)
  Billy Knight (fourth round)
  Robert Keith Wilson (fourth round)

Draw

Key
 Q = Qualifier
 WC = Wild card
 LL = Lucky loser
 r = Retired

Finals

Earlier rounds

Section 1

Section 2

Section 3

Section 4

Section 5

Section 6

Section 7

Section 8

External links
   on the French Open website

1960
1960 in French tennis